Tha Chana railway station is a railway station located in Tha Chana Subdistrict, Tha Chana District, Surat Thani.

Services 
 Special Express No. 43 Bangkok-Surat Thani
 Special Express No. 39/40 Bangkok-Surat Thani-Bangkok
 Special Express No. 41 Bangkok-Yala
 Rapid No. 167/168 Bangkok-Kantang-Bangkok
 Rapid No. 171/172 Bangkok-Sungai Kolok-Bangkok
 Rapid No. 173/174 Bangkok-Nakhon Si Thammarat-Bangkok
 Local No. 445/446 Chumphon-Hat Yai Junction-Chumphon

References 
 
 

Railway stations in Thailand
Surat Thani province